Reitano (Sicilian: Ritanu) is a comune (municipality) in the Metropolitan City of Messina in the Italian region of Sicily, about  east of Palermo and about  west of Messina.  
 
Reitano borders the following municipalities: Mistretta, Motta d'Affermo, Pettineo, Santo Stefano di Camastra.

References

Cities and towns in Sicily